Lost Gravity is a steel roller coaster at Walibi Holland, located in Biddinghuizen, Flevoland, Netherlands which was manufactured by Mack Rides and constructed by RCS GmbH, opening to the public on 24 March 2016.

History 
Construction on the ride was completed in January 2016. The design of the trains was revealed on 19 February 2016 and a week later, testing began.

The roller coaster opened on 24 March 2016.

Ride 
Two inversions were also installed on the route: a dive drop and a zero-g-roll. There are also fire and water effects while driving, while they are activated by sensors on the track, the fire elements usually won’t get activated.

Design 
2 inversions:
Dive drop
Zero-g roll
The ride is alternately painted yellow and black. It was the first of Mack Rides BigDipper model roller coasters. The model is unusual in that as well as having two seats above the track, each row also has two outer seats suspended on the sides of the track; one on the left and one on the right. Two Intamin coasters also utilise this seating arrangement: Skyrush at Hersheypark and Flying Aces at Ferrari World Abu Dhabi.

Gallery

References

External Links